Rudolph Xavier Mirander (born 5 January 1951) is a Jamaican former cyclist. He competed at the 1972 Summer Olympics and the 1976 Summer Olympics.

References

External links
 

1951 births
Living people
Jamaican male cyclists
Olympic cyclists of Jamaica
Cyclists at the 1972 Summer Olympics
Cyclists at the 1976 Summer Olympics
Commonwealth Games silver medallists for Jamaica
Cyclists at the 1974 British Commonwealth Games
Cyclists at the 1978 Commonwealth Games
Sportspeople from Kingston, Jamaica
Commonwealth Games medallists in cycling
Medallists at the 1974 British Commonwealth Games